Karagandy-Arena is an ice hockey indoor arena in Karagandy, Kazakhstan. It opened in 2011 and holds approximately 5,500 people. It is primarily used for ice hockey and is the home arena of Saryarka Karagandy hockey club. It is also used for concerts, exhibitions and as a skating rink.

The first game in Karagandy Arena took place in 2012, with Barys Astana-2. Since then, it has been host to a number of events.

References

External links
Arena on the Saryarka Karagandy Website

Saryarka Karagandy
Indoor ice hockey venues in Kazakhstan